The Association Medicine / Pharmacy Sciences (AMPS) is an association of French students of medicine and pharmacy.

History 

The Association was founded in 2009. It participates in the organization of the congress YR and is mainly composed of students who have the dual curriculum of the ENS, School of the Inserm of Paris V - VII and Paris VI. In January 2012, it had more than 200 members.

Objectives 

The Association promotes the development of dual studies in France; interactions between medicine, pharmacy and research and connects students who have completed this course.

Partners 

 School of Inserm Liliane Bettencourt
 Foundation for Medical Research
 LABCO
 University of Paris V
 ANEMF
 American Physician Scientists Association (APSA)
 Clinician Investigator Trainee Association of Canada (CITAC)
 School of Neuroscience Paris Ile-de-France
 Association of PhD students and young doctors of the Institut Curie

References

External links
 —Official AMPS site
 —AMPS 2012 Conference
 —#  RHinserm.fr
 —University of Paris: Medecine

Student organizations in France
Medical Pharmaceutical Sciences
Medical education in France
Medical students
Students in France